Kaththukkutti is a 2015 Indian Tamil language romantic comedy film directed by R. Saravanan and produced by Ramkumar. The film stars Narain and Srushti Dange, with Soori in another pivotal role. The film was released in October 2015 to positive reviews but low reception from audience.

Cast 

 Narain as Arivazhagan
 Srushti Dange as Bhuvana
 Soori as Ginger
 Tulasi as Arivazhagan's mother
 Bharathiraja as Santhanam, Arivazhagan's father
 Raja as Bhuvana's father
 V. Gnanavel as Maavattam
 K. G. Mohan as Manjapai
 Kadhal Saravanan
 Theni Murugan
 Nadhaswaram Kannan
 Devipriya as herself
 Sandhya (special appearance) in an item number

Production
Production on the film began quietly in late 2013, with debutant director Saravanan opting to give actor Narain an opportunity to make a comeback, following a hiatus after Mugamoodi (2012). The film also features Jayaraj, brother of actor-director Bharathiraja, who makes his acting debut. Sandhya signed on to appear in the film in June 2014 and would appear as one of the two pairs for Soori in the film, the other being Devipriya.

Soundtrack
Music is composed by Aruldev

Reception
Sify wrote "The only problem with Kathukutty is the low production values and music, cinematography and editing are strictly average. Nevertheless the film has its good moments and can be watched once.You will not be disappointed.describing the film as "Above Average".

References

External links
Kaththukkutti Website

2010s Tamil-language films
2015 films
2015 directorial debut films